Rečica is a village in the municipality of Kumanovo, North Macedonia.

Demographics
According to the 2002 census, the village had a total of 557 inhabitants. Ethnic groups in the village include:

Macedonians 110
Serbs 445
Albanians 1
Others 1

Sports
Local football club FK Rečica plays in the Macedonian Third League (North Division).

References

Villages in Kumanovo Municipality
Serb communities in North Macedonia